"Just a Little Lovin' (Will Go a Long Way)" is a 1948 song written by Eddy Arnold and Zeke Clements. Eddy Arnold's recording of the song was his fifth number one in a row on the Folk Records chart, spending four non consecutive weeks on the Best Seller chart with a peak position of No. 13.

Other recordings
Bing Crosby - recorded with Grady Martin and His Slew Foot Five on March 23, 1952. 
Eddie Fisher - this reached the Billboard Best Seller charts in 1952 with a peak position. of No. 20.
Tommy Edwards - for his album Tommy Edwards Sings Golden Country Hits (1961).
Ray Charles - for his album Modern Sounds in Country and Western Music (1962)
Dean Martin - included in his album Dean "Tex" Martin Rides Again (1963)

References

 
 

1948 songs
Eddy Arnold songs
Songs written by Zeke Clements
Songs written by Eddy Arnold